W. Alec Osborn,  (born 1939) is a British mechanical engineer.

Osborn attended Grantham College, where he apprenticed with British Racing Motors, working on projects including the BRM Formula 1 H16 and V12 engines.

Starting in 1969, he worked at Perkins Engines, from design engineer to chief engineer. 
He became a consultant in 2002.

He is on the boards of the Deacon's School, and Hereward Community College. He became director of the Thomas Deacon Academy in 2004. Osborn has received an MBE (Member of the British Empire) for his services to education.

In 2002, he was made a Freeman of the City of London, and was made a fellow of the IMechE in 1991. He is on the Dewar Trophy Technical Sub-Committee.

References

External links

Living people
1939 births
Fellows of the Institution of Mechanical Engineers
Members of the Order of the British Empire
Alumni of Grantham College